Helena Lundbäck (born 15 March 1976) is a Swedish equestrian. She competed at the 2000 Summer Olympics and the 2008 Summer Olympics.

References

External links
 

1976 births
Living people
Swedish female equestrians
Olympic equestrians of Sweden
Equestrians at the 2000 Summer Olympics
Equestrians at the 2008 Summer Olympics
Sportspeople from Norrköping